Coëx is a commune of the Vendée department in the Pays de la Loire region in western France. The organist Joseph Joubert (1878–1963) was born in Coëx.

Points of interest
 Jardin des Olfacties

See also
Communes of the Vendée department

References

Communes of Vendée